Serrata (serrated (saw-like) in Latin) may refer to:
 Ora serrata, the serrated junction between the retina and the ciliary body
 Serrata (bridle), a kind of hackamore bridle used by Hispanic riders, including in the United States
 Serrata (gastropod), a sea snail genus in the family Marginellidae
 Serrata, Italy,  a comune in the Province of Reggio Calabria
 Sutura serrata, a type of suture in anatomy

See also
Serrata del Maggior Consiglio, the constitutional process, started in 1297, by which membership of the Great Council of Venice became an hereditary title